Thomas James Gugliotta (born December 19, 1969) is an American former professional basketball player who played thirteen seasons in the National Basketball Association (NBA).

Early life
Gugliotta was born in Huntington Station on New York’s Long Island. He is the youngest of seven children, and has far Italian descents (from Sicily). He attended Walt Whitman High School. His two older brothers, Frank Jr. and Charlie, both enjoyed limited collegiate success on the hardwood and played professionally in Europe. His father called an old friend, Jim Valvano at North Carolina State University during his senior season and told Valvano that his youngest son was going to be a special basketball player. Valvano took a chance on Gugliotta and brought him to Raleigh.

College career

During his freshman season, "Googs" was limited by a knee injury. However, he emerged in the second half of the ACC season as a member of the rotation for the Wolfpack and appeared in 28 games, averaging two points and 1.3 rebounds per game. During the offseason, Valvano began telling crowds at Wolfpack Club meetings that Gugliotta was beginning to blossom. Emerging as a taller, heavier sophomore, Gugliotta averaged 11.1 points and seven rebounds a game. As a junior, Gugliotta began to show his star potential, averaging more than 15 points and nine rebounds per game. As a senior, Gugliotta averaged more than 22 points and almost 10 rebounds per game.

NBA

Gugliotta was drafted in 1992 out of NC State with the sixth overall pick by the National Basketball Association's Washington Bullets. In 13 NBA seasons he averaged 13.0 ppg, 7.3 rpg and 2.8 apg over 763 regular season games, but appeared in only 12 playoff games. His best years were with the Minnesota Timberwolves, scoring 20.6 and 20.1 ppg in the 1996–1997 and 1997–1998 seasons.  Gugliotta also played for the Golden State Warriors, Phoenix Suns, Boston Celtics, Utah Jazz and the Atlanta Hawks.

Accident

On December 17, 1999, Gugliotta had a near-death experience. Having trouble sleeping after games, Gugliotta took a supplement marketed as a "sleep aid" which included furanon di-hydro, also known as gamma butyrolactone, or GBL. Gugliotta was talking to his wife, Nikki, on his cellular telephone when he collapsed and stopped breathing. His wife heard the commotion and called the wife of teammate Rex Chapman, who was able to call her husband on the bus and instruct him to check his bag for the supplement bottle. The information saved Gugliotta's life, as doctors were able to give him an antidote in the emergency room moments later.

Personal
Tom met his wife, Nikki, at North Carolina State and later had a daughter, Greer.  They were later divorced.

He was inducted into the Suffolk Sports Hall of Fame on Long Island in the Basketball Category with the Class of 1994.

NBA career statistics

Regular season

|-
| style="text-align:left;"| 1992–93
| style="text-align:left;"| Washington
| 81 || 81 || 34.5 || .426 || .281 || .644 || 9.6 || 3.8 || 1.7 || 0.4 || 14.7
|-
| style="text-align:left;"| 1993–94
| style="text-align:left;"| Washington
| 78 || 78 || 35.8 || .466 || .270 || .685 || 9.3 || 3.5 || 2.2 || 0.7 || 17.1
|-
| style="text-align:left;"| 1994–95
| style="text-align:left;"| Washington
| 6 || 6 || 37.7 || .398 || .500 || .788 || 8.8 || 3.0 || 3.5 || 1.8 || 16.0
|-
| style="text-align:left;"| 1994–95
| style="text-align:left;"| Golden State
| 40 || 40 || 33.1 || .443 || .311 || .567 || 7.4 || 3.1 || 1.3 || 0.6 || 10.9
|-
| style="text-align:left;"| 1994–95
| style="text-align:left;"| Minnesota
| 31 || 17 || 32.8 || .454 || .318 || .762 || 7.2 || 4.5 || 2.0 || 0.9 || 14.4
|-
| style="text-align:left;"| 1995–96
| style="text-align:left;"| Minnesota
| 78 || 78 || 36.3 || .471 || .302 || .773 || 8.8 || 3.1 || 1.8 || 1.2 || 16.2
|-
| style="text-align:left;"| 1996–97
| style="text-align:left;"| Minnesota
| 81 || 81 || 38.7 || .442 || .258 || .820 || 8.7 || 4.1 || 1.6 || 1.1 || 20.6
|-
| style="text-align:left;"| 1997–98
| style="text-align:left;"| Minnesota
| 41 || 41 || 38.6 || .502 || .118 || .821 || 8.7 || 4.1 || 1.5 || 0.5 || 20.1
|-
| style="text-align:left;"| 1998–99
| style="text-align:left;"| Phoenix
| 43 || 43 || 36.3 || .483 || .286 || .794 || 8.9 || 2.8 || 1.4 || 0.5 || 17.4
|-
| style="text-align:left;"| 1999–00
| style="text-align:left;"| Phoenix
| 54 || 54 || 32.7 || .481 || .125 || .775 || 7.9 || 2.3 || 1.5 || 0.6 || 13.7
|-
| style="text-align:left;"| 2000–01
| style="text-align:left;"| Phoenix
| 57 || 2 || 20.3 || .392 || .250 || .792 || 4.5 || 1.0 || 0.8 || 0.4 || 6.4
|-
| style="text-align:left;"| 2001–02
| style="text-align:left;"| Phoenix
| 44 || 40 || 25.7 || .422 || .333 || .757 || 5.0 || 1.8 || 0.9 || 0.7 || 6.5
|-
| style="text-align:left;"| 2002–03
| style="text-align:left;"| Phoenix
| 27 || 11 || 16.6 || .455 || .000 || 1.000 || 3.7 || 1.1 || 0.5 || 0.2 || 4.8
|-
| style="text-align:left;"| 2003–04
| style="text-align:left;"| Phoenix
| 30|| 3 || 10.1 || .313 || .000 || .750 || 1.9 || 0.7 || 0.5 || 0.1 || 2.3
|-
| style="text-align:left;"| 2003–04
| style="text-align:left;"| Utah
| 25 || 24 || 20.6 || .375 || .333 || .700 || 5.2 || 1.7 || 0.7 || 0.3 || 3.7
|-
| style="text-align:left;"| 2004–05
| style="text-align:left;"| Boston
| 20 || 0 || 10.9 || .297 || – || .667 || 2.2 || 0.6 || 0.5 || 0.6 || 1.3
|-
| style="text-align:left;"| 2004–05
| style="text-align:left;"| Atlanta
| 27 || 9 || 27.7 || .431 || .308 || .784 || 5.5 || 2.1 || 1.2 || 0.5 || 7.9
|- class="sortbottom"
| style="text-align:center;" colspan="2"| Career
| 763 || 608 || 30.9 || .451 || .284 || .784 || 7.3 || 2.8 || 1.4 || 0.6 || 13.0
|- class="sortbottom"
| style="text-align:center;" colspan="2"| All-Star
| 1 || 0 || 19.0 || .429 || .000 || .750 || 8.0 || 3.0 || 2.0 || – || 9.0

Playoffs

|-
| style="text-align:left;"| 1996–97
| style="text-align:left;"| Minnesota
| 3 || 3 || 40.3 || .422 || .750 || .600 || 5.3 || 4.3 || 2.3 || 0.7 || 18.3
|-
| style="text-align:left;"| 1998–99
| style="text-align:left;"| Phoenix
| 3 || 3 || 39.3 || .371 || – || .750 || 8.3 || 3.3 || 1.3 || 1.0 || 10.7
|-
| style="text-align:left;"| 2000–01
| style="text-align:left;"| Phoenix
| 4 || 0 || 21.5 || .308 || – || .778 || 3.8 || 0.8 || 2.0 || 0.3 || 5.8
|-
| style="text-align:left;"| 2002–03
| style="text-align:left;"| Phoenix
| 2 || 0 || 5.0 || .500 || – || .500 || 1.0 || 0.0 || 0.0 || 0.0 || 2.5
|- class="sortbottom"
| style="text-align:center;" colspan="2"| Career
| 12 || 6 || 27.9 || .393 || .750 || .690 || 4.8 || 2.2 || 1.6 || 0.5 || 9.6

Notes

External links
Historical Player Profile at NBA.com

 https://www.basketball-reference.com/players/g/guglito01.html

1969 births
Living people
All-American college men's basketball players
American men's basketball players
American people of Italian descent
Atlanta Hawks players
Basketball players from New York (state)
Boston Celtics players
Golden State Warriors players
Minnesota Timberwolves players
National Basketball Association All-Stars
NC State Wolfpack men's basketball players
People from Huntington Station, New York
Phoenix Suns players
Power forwards (basketball)
Sportspeople from Suffolk County, New York
United States men's national basketball team players
Utah Jazz players
Washington Bullets draft picks
Washington Bullets players